Zdeněk Ondrášek (born 22 December 1988) is a Czech professional footballer who plays as a forward for Wisła Kraków and the Czech Republic national team.

Club career

Dynamo České Budějovice
Ondrášek started his career in the South-Bohemian side České Budějovice in 2007, doing a short loan-spell at FC Zenit Čáslav in 2009. Upon returning to Dynamo, he delivered a decent season, becoming the top scorer for the club during the 2010–11 Czech First League. The following season he was seen as the key pillar of the team, scoring eight league goals in twenty rounds. The last two matches he was injured due to a fractured finger. His good performance drew the attention of foreign clubs. Upon his transfer to Tromsø in 2012, the manager of Dynamo Jiří Kotrba noted that if the sale went through it would be an historic event, as it was the first time in history that Dynamo had sold a player directly abroad.

Tromsø IL
Ondrášek joined the Norwegian side Tromsø IL on a loan in March 2012.  He made an immediate impact on the club. In the league opener, Ondrášek came in off the bench for his debut and, despite heavy snow, scored the only goal in a 1-0 win against Fredrikstad FK. His starting debut came a week later 4 April during an away draw against Aalesunds FK.   He continued playing well and contributed a total of 8 goals in 14 matches before Tromsø IL decided to make the move permanent and signed him to a contract that will see him stay at the club until 2015. The season proved to be a great success for the Czech striker, seeing him score 14 goals and becoming the top goalscorer in the league that season. This was just two goals short of his pre-season pledge of 16.

Wisła Kraków
Ondrášek was transferred to Polish first-division team Wisła Kraków in 2016, where he has appeared in 66 matches in Ekstraklasa, scoring 20 goals and nine assists. He has also scored one goal and one assist in three Polish Cup matches.

FC Dallas
Ondrášek signed with FC Dallas of Major League Soccer on 18 December 2018.

Viktoria Plzeň
On 13 September 2020, Ondrášek signed for Viktoria Plzeň for an undisclosed fee. He made the decision to return to the Czech Republic for family reasons.

FCSB
Ondrášek signed with Romanian Liga 1 club FCSB on 28 June 2021. On 29 July, club owner Gigi Becali terminated his contract after just one month at the club and 68 minutes of total playing time. Becali said, "This is not a player for our team, it does not reach our level".

Return to Tromsø IL
On 30 August 2021, Tromsø IL announced that Ondrášek had signed with the club, reuniting him with the team.

Return to Wisła Kraków
Having left Tromsø at the end of 2021, he returned to Wisła Kraków after signing a one-and-a-half-year deal with the Polish side on 7 January 2022.

International career
On 2 October 2019, Ondrášek received his first senior call up from the Czech Republic for their UEFA Euro 2020 qualifier against England. On 11 October in his international debut, he came on as a substitute and scored the winning goal for the Czech Republic in their 2–1 victory over England.

Personal life
Nicknamed "The Cobra" due to a large tattoo of a cobra on his back, Ondrášek sports a host of other tattoos.

Career statistics

Club

International

Scores and results list Czech Republic's goal tally first, score column indicates score after each Ondrášek goal.

Honours
Individual
Tippeligaen top scorer: 2012 (14 goals)

References

External links
 
 Guardian Football
 
 

1988 births
Living people
People from Strakonice
Czech footballers
Association football forwards
Czech Republic under-21 international footballers
Czech Republic international footballers
Czech First League players
Czech National Football League players
Eliteserien players
Norwegian First Division players
Ekstraklasa players
Major League Soccer players
Liga I players
SK Dynamo České Budějovice players
FK Čáslav players
Tromsø IL players
Wisła Kraków players
FC Dallas players
FC Viktoria Plzeň players
FC Steaua București players
Czech expatriate footballers
Czech expatriate sportspeople in Norway
Expatriate footballers in Norway
Czech expatriate sportspeople in Poland
Expatriate footballers in Poland
Czech expatriate sportspeople in the United States
Expatriate soccer players in the United States
Czech expatriate sportspeople in Romania
Expatriate footballers in Romania
Sportspeople from the South Bohemian Region